Vítor Silva Duarte (born 31 August 1959) is a former Mozambique-born Portuguese football player.

He played 8 seasons and 200 games in the Primeira Liga, mostly with Braga and also with Beira-Mar, Farense and Benfica.

Club career
He made his professional debut in the Primeira Liga for Benfica on 1 December 1985 as a late substitute in a 1–0 victory over Académica de Coimbra.

References

1959 births
Living people
Portuguese people of Mozambican descent
Sportspeople from Maputo
Portuguese footballers
Associação Académica de Coimbra – O.A.F. players
S.L. Benfica footballers
Primeira Liga players
S.C. Farense players
S.C. Braga players
S.C. Beira-Mar players
Liga Portugal 2 players
Association football defenders